Hounslow power station generated and supplied electricity to the district of Hounslow, Heston and Isleworth in west London from 1904 to 1964. Originally steam powered, diesel engine generators were added in the 1950s.The station was owned and operated by Heston and Isleworth Borough Council until the nationalisation of the electricity industry in 1948. The power station was redeveloped as demand for electricity grew and old plant was replaced until its closure in 1964.

History
In 1900 Heston and Isleworth Urban District Council applied for a Provisional Order under the Electric Lighting Acts to generate and supply electricity to the district. This was granted by the Board of Trade and was confirmed by Parliament through the Electric Lighting Orders Confirmation (No. 12) Act 1900 (63 & 64 Vict. c. clxx). The Council built a generating station in Bridge Street, Hounslow (51°28'10"N 0°20'53"W) known as Hounslow power station. It was first commissioned in November 1904.

The station continued to generate electricity for the Council until the nationalisation of the British electricity industry in 1948. The Heston and Isleworth electricity undertaking was abolished, ownership of the power station was vested in the British Electricity Authority, and subsequently the Central Electricity Authority and the Central Electricity Generating Board (CEGB). At the same time the electricity distribution and sales responsibilities of the Council’s electricity undertaking was transferred to the Southern Electricity Board (SEB). The station was decommissioned in 1964.

Equipment specification
By 1923 the generating plant comprised:

 Boilers generating 42,500 lb/h (5.35 kg/s) of steam, this was supplied to:
 Generators
 2 × 125 kW reciprocating engine generators
 2 × 250 kW reciprocating engine generators
 1 × 500 kW reciprocating engine generator

These machines gave a total generating capacity of 1,250 kW of direct current.

Electricity supplies to consumers were at 480 & 240 Volt DC.

The plant in 1958 comprised:

 Boilers:
 3 × Babcock & Wilcox 12,500 lb/h (1.57 kg/s) boilers with chain grate stokers, operating at 200 psi and 550 °F (13.8 bar and 288 °C) and feeding steam to two generating sets:
 Generating sets
 1 × 1,000 kW Fraser & Chalmers–GEC DC generator set
 1 × 1,350 kW Brush Ljungstrom AC turbo-alternator,
 2 × 900 kW General Motors diesel engines coupled to Elliott alternators
 The total installed generating capacity was 4.15 MW, with an output capacity of 3 MW.

Condenser cooling water was drawn from a well, there was also a spray pond.

Operations
Summary operating data for Hounslow power station:

The use of electricity in the period 1921–23 was:

Operating data 1954–63
Operating data for Hounslow power station:

The electricity output, in MWh, from the Hounslow power station is shown graphically.

Closure
The steam plant was decommissioned in 1963 and the rest of Hounslow power station was closed in 1964. The site is currently (2020) an electricity substation.

See also
 Timeline of the UK electricity supply industry
 List of power stations in England

References

Coal-fired power stations in England
Demolished power stations in the United Kingdom
Buildings and structures in the London Borough of Hounslow